WASP-6 is a type-G yellow dwarf star located about 600 light-years away in the Aquarius constellation. Dim at magnitude 12, it is visible through a moderate sized amateur telescope. The star is about 80% of the size and mass of the Sun and it is a little cooler. Starspots in the WASP-6 system helped to refine the measurements of the mass and the radius of the planet WASP-6b.

Planetary system
The SuperWASP project announced that this star has an extrasolar planet, WASP-6b, in 2008. This object was detected by the astronomical transit method.

Naming
In 2019 the IAU announced that WASP-6 and its planet WASP-6b would be given official names chosen by the public from the proposals collected in a national campaign from The Dominican Republic, as part of NameExoWorlds. The star WASP-6 is named Márohu and its planet Boinayel from the proposal received by Marvin del Cid. Márohu the cemí of drought is the protector of the Sun.

See also
 SuperWASP or WASP Planetary Search Program
 List of extrasolar planets

References

External links
 WASP Planets
 WASP primary website
 The Extrasolar Planets Encyclopaedia

Aquarius (constellation)
G-type main-sequence stars
Planetary transit variables
Planetary systems with one confirmed planet
J23123773-2240261
6